Lavender is a genus of flowering plants, especially the species Lavandula angustifolia.

Lavender may also refer to:

Film and television
 Lavender (1953 film), an Austrian-German film directed by Arthur Maria Rabenalt
 Lavender (2000 film), a Hong Kong film starring Takeshi Kaneshiro, Kelly Chen and Eason Chan
 Lavender (2015 film), a Malayalam film
 Lavender (2016 film), an American drama film
 Lavender (2019 film), an American short LGBT romantic drama film directed by Matthew Puccini
 Lavender (TV series), a 2002 Taiwanese television drama starring Tammy Chen and Ambrose Hsu

Music
 Lavender (album), by Machiko Yamane and Paul Christopher Musgrave
 "Lavender" (BadBadNotGood song), a 2016 song by Canadian band BadBadNotGood
 "Lavender" (Marillion song), a 1985 hit single by Marillion based on the folk song
 "Lavender (Nightfall Remix)", a 2017 single by Snoop Dogg
 "Lavender", a song on the 1991 Beach Boys album Lost & Found (1961–62)

Places

United States
 Lavender, Georgia, an unincorporated community
 Lavender, Washington, an unincorporated community
 Lavender Peak (Colorado), a mountain in the La Plata Mountains
 Lavender Mountain, Georgia
 Lavender Creek, Georgia

Elsewhere
 Lavender Peak (British Columbia), Canada, a mountain in the Coast Mountains
 Lavender, Singapore, a subzone
 Lavender MRT station, Kallang, Singapore

Ships
 , two Royal Navy ships
 , a Union Navy steamer in the American Civil War

Other uses
 Lavender (surname)
 Lavender (chicken plumage)
 Lavender (color)
 Lavender Line, a heritage railway in East Sussex, England
 Lavender (magazine), published in Minneapolis, Minnesota, United States
 Lavender Brown, a fictional character in the Harry Potter books
 Lavender Town, a fictional town in Pokémon Red and Blue

See also
 Lavender linguistics, the study of language revolving around people identifying as LGBTQ
 Lavender revolution or gay liberation movement
 Lavender scare, part of McCarthyism
 Lavanda (disambiguation)